The 1979 Northern Illinois Huskies football team represented Northern Illinois University as a member of the Mid-American Conference (MAC) during 1979 NCAA Division I-A football season. Led by Pat Culpepper in his fourth and final season as head coach, the Huskies compiled an overall record of 5–5–1 with a mark of 3–3–1 in conference play, placing sixth in the MAC. Northern Illinois played home games at Huskie Stadium in DeKalb, Illinois.

Schedule

References

Northern Illinois
Northern Illinois Huskies football seasons
Northern Illinois Huskies football